The Ciorogârla is a left tributary of the river Sabar in Romania. It discharges into the Sabar in Jilava. For the flood protection of the city of Bucharest the floods of the Dâmbovița are diverted at Brezoaele into the Ciorogârla.

References

Rivers of Romania
Rivers of Ilfov County
Rivers of Giurgiu County